Michael Endrass (born September 18, 1988) is a German professional ice hockey player. He played for the Straubing Tigers in the Deutsche Eishockey Liga (DEL). He joined the Tigers from fellow DEL club, the Krefeld Pinguine.

References

External links

1988 births
Living people
German ice hockey left wingers
Krefeld Pinguine players
Sportspeople from Füssen
Straubing Tigers players